Graham Barham Usher (born 11 September 1970) is an Anglican bishop and ecologist. Since 2019, he has been the Bishop of Norwich; he had previously served as Bishop of Dudley, a suffragan bishop in the Diocese of Worcester.

Early life
Usher was born on 11 September 1970. He was baptised by Douglas Sargent, the then Bishop of Selby. His early years were spent living in Ghana. Between 1981 and 1989, he was educated at Pocklington School, a private school in Pocklington, Yorkshire. He studied ecological science at the University of Edinburgh, graduating with a Bachelor of Science (BSc) degree in 1993. He then attended the University of Cambridge where he studied theology at Corpus Christi College, Cambridge. He graduated with a Bachelor of Arts (BA) degree in 1995; this degree was later promoted to Master of Arts (MA Cantab), as per tradition. Following the completion of his theology studies, he trained for the priesthood at Westcott House, Cambridge, and St. Nicholas Theological Seminary in Ghana.

Ordained ministry
Usher was ordained in the Church of England as a deacon in 1996 and as a priest in 1997. He was then a curate at St Mary the Virgin, Nunthorpe, Middlesbrough, from 1996 to 1999. While serving his curacy, he was also worked with young offenders as a chaplain at HM Prison Northallerton. He was Vicar of North Ormesby, Middlesbrough between 1999 and 2004. The area has deep social and economic needs and is in the top two percent of deprived areas in England.

He was rector and lecturer of Hexham Abbey for ten years from 2004 to 2014. Hexham Abbey is a large parish church that can be described as cathedral-like. During his time as rector, the congregation grew and he supported the setting up of a food bank covering West Northumberland. He also reunited the abbey with its monastic buildings, the buildings having been separated during the Reformation, raising £3.2M to fully refurbish the building and create a stunning new cloister, refectory, conference and meeting rooms, and a state of the art exhibition about the Abbey's history. In 2009, he undertook a visit to Rome with the men and boys of the Hexham Abbey Choir. They had been invited to sing at a mass in St. Peter's Basilica, in celebration of the 1300th anniversary of the death of St Wilfrid. In addition to his parish duties, he was Area Dean of Hexham from 2006 to 2011. He was appointed an Honorary Canon of Kumasi in Ghana, the place of his early childhood, in 2007.

Episcopal ministry
On 12 December 2013, it was announced that he was to become the next Bishop of Dudley, a suffragan bishop in the Diocese of Worcester. He was consecrated on 25 March 2014 by Archbishop Justin Welby at St Paul's Cathedral, London. He was 43 at his appointment, making him the one of the youngest of the current Church of England bishops and the first to have been born in the 1970s.

Since 2017 he has been a member of the International Commission for Anglican Orthodox Theological Dialogue.

On 3 May 2019, Usher was announced as the next Bishop of Norwich, the diocesan bishop of the Diocese of Norwich. His election was confirmed on 17 June 2019 at St Mary-le-Bow. He was enthroned as the 72nd Bishop of Norwich in Norwich Cathedral on 9 November 2019 during a very inclusive service which included Down Syndrome dancers, children and refugees participating. Honey cake was served to the 1800 strong congregation made with honey from Usher's own bees.

In 2020 he was appointed as the Church of England's episcopal member of the Anglican Consultative Council.

In March 2021 the Archbishop of Canterbury announced that Usher would be the Church of England's lead bishop for the environment.

Views
Usher voted in favour of the introduction of blessings for same-sex couples by the Church of England.

Other work
Having completed an undergraduate degree in ecology, Usher continues to have interest in the field. Between 2008 and 2010, he was a member of the Forestry Commission's Regional Advisory Committee (RAC) for the North East of England. In 2010, he was appointed chairman of the North East RAC. In December 2013, the Regional Advisory Committees changed name to become the Forestry and Woodlands Advisory Committees (FWACs). He continued as chair of the new North East FWAC. He stood down from his role with the Forestry commission following the announcement that he would be joining the episcopate and leaving the North East.

In April 2009, he was appointed a member of the Northumberland National Park Authority by the Secretary of State for Environment, Food and Rural Affairs. In April 2013, he was re-appointed by the Secretary of State to the Northumberland National Park Authority, his previous term having ended, but resigned when he moved from the North East.

In 2012, he contributed an article for the website of the Diocese of Newcastle concerning Ash dieback in the UK. Also in 2012, he published a book titled Places of Enchantment: Meeting God in landscapes. The book concerns the relationship between people, God and the environment; particularly people experiencing God in the natural world, rather than through organised religion such as church services.

In April 2020 he published The Way Under Our Feet: A Spirituality of Walking.

From March 2016 until November 2020 he was a member of the Human Tissue Authority, appointed by the Secretary of State for Health.

Personal life
Usher is married to Rachel Thomson, a general practitioner who was also educated at Pocklington School. Together, they have two children.

References

External links
Usher's Twitter account

Living people
21st-century Church of England bishops
Bishops of Norwich
Bishops of Dudley
British chaplains
1970 births
People educated at Pocklington School
Alumni of the University of Edinburgh
Alumni of Corpus Christi College, Cambridge
Alumni of Westcott House, Cambridge
British ecologists